Crocus Technology, founded in 2006, is a venture-capital-backed semiconductor startup company developing magnetoresistive random-access memory (MRAM) technology. The company's products originated in a Grenoble-based Spintec laboratory and its technology is licensed  for stand-alone and embedded chip applications.

History
Crocus Technology was founded in Grenoble in 2004, based on research at the Spintec laboratory.
The company eventually moved its headquarters to Santa Clara, California, but retained its engineering base in Grenoble.

Products and technologies
Crocus Technology develops and supplies magnetic sensors based on its revolutionary and patented XtremeSense® TMR technology. Crocus’ magnetic sensors bring significant advantages to industrial and consumer electronic applications requiring high sensitivity, stable magnetic performance over temperature, low power and low noise while lowering the overall total solution cost.

Thermal-assisted switching (TAS) is a second-generation approach to magnetoresistive random-access memory (MRAM) currently being developed.  A few different designs have been proposed, but all rely on the idea of reducing the required switching fields by heating.
The first design's cell, which was proposed by James M. Daughton and co-workers, had a heating element, an MRAM bit and an orthogonal digit line, and used a low-Curie point ferromagnetic material as the storage layer.
In a second and more promising design, which was developed by the Spintec Laboratory (France) and subsequently licensed to Crocus Technology, the storage layer is made of a ferromagnetic and an antiferromagnetic layer.  When the cell is heated by flowing a heating current through the junction and the temperature exceeds the "blocking temperature" (Tb), the ferromagnetic layer is freed, and the data is written by application of a magnetic field while cooling down.
When idle, the cell's temperature is below the blocking temperature and much more stable.

This approach offers multiple advantages over previous MRAM technologies:
 Because the write selection is temperature-driven, it eliminates write-selectivity problems;
 It is a low-power approach, as only one magnetic field is required to write, and because the cell stability and magnetic susceptibility are decoupled as a result of the introduction of the blocking temperature; and
 It is thermally stable due to the exchange bias of the storage layer.

Patents
In intellectual property, the company possesses 154 patents supporting its products.  Crocus also has a long-term exclusive license to MRAM-related intellectual property developed at Spintec, CNRS, and CEA.

Joint ventures

On June 18, 2009, Crocus Technology announced a partnership with an integrated circuit specialty foundry Tower Semiconductor. As part of the deal, both companies will dedicate special equipment to Tower’s factory, and Tower will fully manufacture Crocus’ MRAM technology in its 200mm Fab2 facility. Tower took a $1.25 million equity position in Crocus.

Investors

Other investors include Idinvest Partners, CDC Innovation, Entreprises et Patriomoine, NanoDimension, Sofinnova Partners, Sofinnova Ventures, and Ventech.

References

Fabless semiconductor companies
Computer memory companies
Companies based in Santa Clara, California
Semiconductor companies of the United States
Privately held companies based in California
Grenoble